The 1999 Indo-Pak series (known as the Pepsi hockey series for sponsorship reasons) was the 6th series of bilateral field hockey matches between India and Pakistan.

The series consisted of nine matches with India hosting the first leg of four matches and Pakistan hosting the second leg of five matches from 3 February 1999 to 24 February 1999.

Pakistan won the series 6–3.

Background 
India went into the series as Asian Games Champions having defeated South Korea in the final of the 1998 Asian Games in December last year. Pakistan had finished runner-ups in the 1998 Champions Trophy in Lahore a month before that.

Venues

Squads

Results 

 Pakistan won the series 6-3

Matches

First Leg 
Match 1

Match 2

Match 3

Match 4

Second Leg 
Match 1

Match 2

Match 3

Match 4

Match 5

Statistics 
Pakistan - Total goals scored 27

India - Total goals scored 21

Goalscorers 
There were 48 goals scored in 9 matches for an average of 5.33 goals per match

References 

India–Pakistan field hockey rivalry
1999 in sports